Tomoxia contracta is a species of beetle in the genus Tomoxia of the family Mordellidae. It was described by George Charles Champion in 1891.

References

Beetles described in 1891
Tomoxia